Juan Ignacio Alessandroni (born 26 December 1988) is an Argentine professional footballer who plays as a midfielder for Mitre.

Career
Alessandroni started his career with Juventud Pergamino in 2006. He remained with the Torneo Argentino A team for four years, scoring one goal in ninety-six fixtures. 2010 saw the midfielder sign for fellow third tier outfit Unión Mar del Plata. His first goal for the club arrived on 26 September during a draw with Cipolletti. He made the last of his one hundred and seventy-nine appearances for Unión in November 2015 against Instituto in Primera B Nacional; following 2014 promotion. In January 2016, Alessandroni joined Mitre. After being selected forty-four times in two seasons, Mitre were promoted to Primera B Nacional for 2017–18.

Career statistics
.

References

External links

1988 births
Living people
People from Pergamino
Argentine footballers
Association football midfielders
Torneo Argentino A players
Torneo Federal A players
Primera Nacional players
Juventud de Pergamino footballers
Unión de Mar del Plata footballers
Club Atlético Mitre footballers
Sportspeople from Buenos Aires Province